Manuel Guanini (born 14 February 1996) is an Argentine footballer who plays for Sarmiento as a centre-back.

References

External links

1996 births
Living people
Association football defenders
Argentine footballers
Club de Gimnasia y Esgrima La Plata footballers
Newell's Old Boys footballers
Club Atlético Sarmiento footballers
Argentine Primera División players
Footballers from La Plata